The Glirinae are a subfamily of dormice (Gliridae); it contains two extant genera, one being monotypic and the other containing two species:

Subfamily Glirinae
Genus Glirulus
Japanese dormouse, Glirulus japonicus
Genus Glis
European edible dormouse, Glis glis
Iranian edible dormouse, Glis persicus

References 

Dormice
Mammal subfamilies